Andrea Gessa (born 12 January 1980) is an Italian former footballer who played as a midfielder.

Career
On 10 July 2012, Gessa was transferred from Pescara to newly relegated Serie B side Cesena in exchange for Giuseppe Colucci.

References

External links
 

1980 births
Footballers from Milan
Living people
Italian footballers
A.S.D. AVC Vogherese 1919 players
A.S. Pizzighettone players
Montevarchi Calcio Aquila 1902 players
F.C. Grosseto S.S.D. players
Delfino Pescara 1936 players
A.C. Cesena players
Frosinone Calcio players
Serie B players
Serie C players
Serie D players
Association football midfielders